Western Sydney Two Blues Rugby, formerly Parramatta Two Blues Rugby, is a rugby union club based in Parramatta, the second CBD of Sydney, Australia. The club was formed in 1879 and competes in the Shute Shield run by the New South Wales Rugby Union. One of the oldest clubs in the Sydney Premier Rugby competition the club has produced nineteen Wallabies over the years, starting with the great Bill Cerutti in 1936 through to the club's current, Tatafu Polota-Nau. To date Parramatta has played in eight First grade grand finals.

History
Western Sydney Two Blues Rugby Club has enjoyed 130 years of top grade rugby in Sydney's premier competition and is one of only five clubs (Manly, Randwick, Parramatta, Gordon and Warringah) to have never been relegated from the Top Grade.

Founded in 1879 as Cumberland, the club played in a senior Competition with University, Wallaroos, Waratah, Redfern and Pirates until 1899 when the existing system was disbanded.

The Club changed its name to Parramatta and was admitted to the Sydney First Grade competition in 1934 contesting its first Grand Final in 1945, a 9–3 defeat to Sydney University. The 1950s and 1960s were lean years but the development of a strong junior competition assured a sharp improvement in standards.

Former Wallaby Rod Phelps took over as captain-coach in 1971 and for three years he improved Parramatta‘s standing in the rugby fraternity. Grand Final appearances in 1974 and 1975 showed that the club was well on its way to becoming a force to be reckoned with.

Finally with the influx of young players in this period Parramatta won its initial First Grade premiership in 1977, a 17–9 victory against Randwick under coach Peter Fenton. The Two Blues had waited 44 years to sample the sweet taste of victory but the wait was worthwhile.

The Club then played in the 1979 and 1984 grand finals going down to Randwick on both occasions but revenge would be sweet in 1985 and 1986 when the underdogs from Sydney’s west succeeded in beating the Galloping Greens to win consecutive premierships under coach Paul Dalton.

In 2018 the club identified the need to evolve and deliver greater opportunity for the game of rugby in Greater Western Sydney. The clubs members originate from all across the West with the club making the strategic decision to re-brand from Parramatta Rugby Club to the Western Sydney Two Blues to better reflect our presence in the competition, our members and playing group and to take lead for the game of rugby in Western Sydney

Four of Parramatta’s favourite sons switched to League with success. Ken Kearney (a Wallaby in 1947 and 1948), Ray Price (a Wallaby between 1974 and 1976), Tony Melrose who played for the Wallabies in 1978 and 1979, and Andrew Leeds who played for his country between 1986 and 1988 all wore the Two Blues with pride and then switched to the Parramatta Eels. Leeds and Peter Kay, capped against England in 1988, were the club’s most recent Wallabies until Tatafu Polota-Nau played two Tests on the Wallabies 2005 Tour against England and Ireland.

Club information 

Club Name:  Western Sydney Two Blues
Nickname: Two Blues
Founded: 1879
Home-stadium: Merrylands RSL Club Rugby Park (Formerly Granville Park)
Uniform colours: Navy-Blue and Sky-Blue
Premiership Titles: 3 titles: 1977, 1985, 1986

Office holders
As of 2021:
President: Scott Rogan
General Manager: Christian Burden
Director of Coaching: Sailosi Tagicakibau
Club Captain: TBA
1st Grade Captain: Aleks Dabek

Current squad

Records

Honours
Grand Finalists and Premiers

Representative players
International men's teams 15-a-side players:
{|style= "table-layout:fixed; width=95%; margin-top:0;margin-left:0;  border-width:1px;border-style:none ;border-color:#ddd; padding:0px; vertical-align:top; font-size:90%;"

| style="width:9em;"|  Australia
| style="width:11em;"| Bob Brown
| Debut: 1975-05-24 vs. England in Sydney Aus / Fullback / (Wallaby 575)
|-
|  Australia
| Bill Cerutti
| Australian Rep in 17 Tests & made famous the number 13 Jersey in the 1920s-30s.
|-
|  Australia
| Phil Clements
| Debut: 1982-09-11 vs. New Zealand in Auckland, NZ / Lock / (Wallaby 631)
|-
|  Australia
| Adam Coleman
| Debut: 2016
|-
|  Australia
| Patrick Cooper
| Played for Wallabies is 1965
|-
|  Australia
| John Griffiths
| Played for Wallabies in 1982
|-
|  Australia
| Peter Kay
| Debut: 1988-06-12 vs. England in Sydney, Aus / Prop / (Wallaby 669)
|-
|  Australia
| Ken Kearney
| Debut: 1947-06-14 vs. New Zealand in Brisbane, Aus / Hooker / (Wallaby 346)
|-
|  Australia
| Martin Knight
| Debut: 1978-06-11 vs. Wales in Brisbane, NZ / Centre / (Wallaby 593)
|-
|  Australia
| Andrew Leeds
| Debut: 1986-09-06 vs. New Zealand in Auckland, NZ / Fullback / (Wallaby 658)
|-
|  Australia
| Mick Martin
| Debut: 1980-05-24 vs. Fiji in Suva, Fiji / Wing / (Wallaby 612)
|-
|  Australia
| Adrian McDonald
| Played for Wallabies in 1983
|-
|  Australia
| Tony Melrose
| Debut: 1978-09-09 vs. New Zealand in Auckland, NZ / Flyhalf / (Wallaby 601)
|-
|  Australia
| Taqele Naiyaravoro
| Debut: 2015
|-
|  Australia
| Rod Phelps
| Debut: 1955-09-03 vs. New Zealand in Dunedin, NZ / Fullback / (Wallaby 412)
|-
|  Australia
| Tatafu Polota-Nau
| Debut: 2005-11-12 vs England in Twickenham, England / Hooker / (Wallaby 806)
|-
|  Australia
| Don Price
| Forward Toured Fiji with the Australian Rugby Union Team in 1980
|-
|  Australia
| Ray Price
| Debut: 1974-05-25 vs. New Zealand in Sydney, Aus / Flanker / (Wallaby 573)
|-
|  Australia
| Reg Sutton
| 1960s?
|-
|  Australia
| Eric Tweedale
| Debut: 1946-09-14 vs. New Zealand in Dunedin, NZ / Prop / (Wallaby 336)
|-
|  Australia
| Malcolm Van Gelder 
| 1960s?
|-
|  Australia
| Lance Walker
| Debut: 1982-08-28 vs. New Zealant in Wellington, NZ / Hooker / (Wallaby 629)
|-
|  Australia
| Stan Wickham
| Played for Wallabies in 1901 to 1906
|-
|  Tonga
| Damien Fakafanua
| Centre/Wing for Tonga in 2012 Pacific Nations Cup
|-
|  Tonga
| John Fonua
| Debut: 2002-06-15 vs. Samoa at Nuku A'lofa, Tonga / Wing / (Tonga Player 472)
|-
|  Tonga
| Sitiveni Mafi
| Lock, Flanker for Tonga Debut in the 2010 Pacific nations Cup
|-
|  Tonga
| Sateki Tuipulotu
| Debut:1994-07-17 vs. Fiji at Nuku A'lofa, Tonga / Fullback / (Tonga Player 368)
|-
|  Fiji
| Taniela Rawaqa
| Fullback/Flyhalf for Fiji. The Second Highest point scorer in Pacific Nations Cup at 103 Points
|-
|  Samoa
| Fa'avaivai Tanoa'i
| Debut: 1996-07-13 Vs. Tonga at Apia, Samoa / Flyhalf
|-
|  Samoa
| Lua Vailoaloa
| Halfback for the Manu Samoa in 2011 Pacific Nations Cup and non travelling reserve in 2011 Rugby World Cup
|-
|  New Zealand
| Sosene Anesi
| Debut: 2005 vs. Fiji in Albany / Fullback,Wing / (All-Black 1054)
|-
|  Canada
| Evan Olmstead
| Debut: 2011 Canada U20 Vs. Georgia in Tbilisi, Georgia / 2nd Row/Flanker/No.8
|-
|  Philippines
| Oliver Saunders
| Current Philippines Rugby player and Top point scorer (Flyhalf)
|-
|  Philippines
| Kenneth Stern
| Current Philippines Rugby Player (Winger)
|}

Other players signed to professional clubs:
{|style= "table-layout:fixed; width=95%; margin-top:0;margin-left:0;  border-width:1px;border-style:none ;border-color:#ddd; padding:0px; vertical-align:top; font-size:90%;"
|-
| style="width:9em;"|  Australia
| style="width:11em;"| Daniel Yakapo
| Rugby Viadana
|-
|  Italy
| Steven Bortolussi
| Petrarca Padova Rugby
|-
|  Samoa
| Iese Leota 
| Stade Montois
|-
|  Samoa
| Chris Seuteni
|  CA Brive
|-
|  Tonga
| Sitiveni Mafi
| Western Force
|}

International women's teams players:
{|style= "table-layout:fixed; width=95%; margin-top:0;margin-left:0;  border-width:1px;border-style:none ;border-color:#ddd; padding:0px; vertical-align:top; font-size:90%;"
|-
| style="width:9em;"|  Australia
| style="width:11em;"| Alex Sulusi 
| Australian women's national rugby union team
|-
|  Australia
| Chloe Butler
|  Australian women's national rugby union team
|-
|  Australia
| Nita Maynard
| Australian women's national rugby union team
|-
|  Australia
| Hanna Sio
| Australian women's national rugby union team (sevens)
|}

Other Australian team representatives:
{|style= "table-layout:fixed; width=95%; margin-top:0;margin-left:0;  border-width:1px;border-style:none ;border-color:#ddd; padding:0px; vertical-align:top; font-size:90%;"
|-
| style="width:9em;"|  Australia
| style="width:11em;"| Daniel Yakapo
| Australian national rugby union team (sevens)
|-
|  Australia
| Andrew Vatuvei
| Australian Schoolboys Rugby Union
|-
|  Australia
| Andrew Cox
| Australian Barbarians Rugby Team
|-
|  Australia
| Josh Kaifa
| Australian Barbarians Rugby Team
|-
|  Australia
| Mika Polota Nau
| Australian Barbarians Rugby Team
|-
|  Australia
| Rodney Ma'a
| Australian Barbarians Rugby Team
|}

Life members

 Greg Baker
 Bruce Coggins
 Denis Garlick
 Frank Lawson
 Jack Liversedge
 Allan Minett
 Roger O'Neill
 Morris Sutton
 Eric Tweedale
 Hilton "Snow" Elliott
 Janice Dewberry
 John Aquilina
 Patrick Dunne
 Peter Thompson
 Gary Hudson
 Geoff Baldwin
 Moala Polota-Nau
 Andrew Cox
 Tatafu Polota-Nau
 Peter Gillett
 Anthony 'Santa' Privett
 Ian Clarke
 Joe Scott

200 club
The following players have played over 200 Grade games for Parramatta Two Blues

 David Bird
 Matthew Campton
 Pat Cooper
 Ray Elliot
 Graham Galloway
 Glen Goddard
 Greg Hackett
 Dominic King
 Ivan Mann
 Gregg Melrose
 David Strong
 Kel Black
 Peter Campton
 Mick Donaldson
 Paul Evans
 John Gardiner
 Andrew Gokel
 Terry Heffernan
 Peter Koen
 Warren Martin
 Allan Minnett
 Craig Minnett
 Glen Stuart
 Tim Calhalane
 Bruce Coggins
 Hilton "Snow" Elliott
 Geoff Ferris
 Dennis Garlick
 Jon Gorman
 Allan Holman
 Frank Lehman
 Peter McDonald
 Andrew Campton
 Joe Cllins
 Kevin Elliott
 Peter Ferris
 Paul Gledhill
 Noel Grant
 Peter Kay
 David Mann
 Keith McKinney
 Steven Simpson

Juniors

Parramatta junior clubs
 Blacktown JRUFC
 Dundas Valley JRUFC
 Hills JRUFC
 Merrylands JRUFC
 Norwest JRUFC
 Liverpool JRUFC

Notable junior players
 Jeremy Su'a - Canterbury Crusaders
 Sam Wykes - Western Force
 Jamal Idris - Gold Coast Titans
 Sisa Waqa - Melbourne Storm
 Jorge Taufua - Manly Sea Eagles
 Leon Bott - Retired
 Tatafu Polota Nau - ACT Brumbies, NSW Waratahs, Western Force, Leicester Tigers
 Sitiveni 'Steve' Mafi - NSW Waratahs, Leicester, Western Force, Castres, London Irish

References

External links 
 http://www.news.com.au/sport/rugby-gold/former-all-black-soseni-anesi-joins-parramattas-two-blues/story-fndpt9s1-1226427514708
 http://www.heraldsun.com.au/sport/rugby-gold/the-parramatta-two-blues-progress-to-shute-shield-finals/story-fn8ouzvd-1226454443914
 http://parramatta-advertiser.whereilive.com.au/sport/story/two-blues-future-looks-bright/
 http://parramatta-advertiser.whereilive.com.au/sport/story/farewell-parramatta-two-blues-go-with-our-blessing/
 http://parramatta-advertiser.whereilive.com.au/sport/story/hooker-revs-up-rookies/
 http://www.nswrugby.com.au/NSWRugby/News/NewsArticle/tabid/374/ArticleID/7371/Default.aspx
 http://www.dailytelegraph.com.au/sport/rugby-gold/former-all-black-soseni-anesi-joins-parramattas-two-blues/story-fn8ti7yn-1226427514708
 http://www.smh.com.au/rugby-union/union-news/hookers-humility-keeps-him-in-touch-with-roots-20120706-21mdx.html

Rugby union teams in Sydney
Rugby clubs established in 1879
1879 establishments in Australia
Sport in Parramatta